Sporting Clube de Esmoriz is a small football club in the Portuguese city of Esmoriz. They currently play in the First Regional Division in Aveiro. The team contains many teenage players, some of them coming from foreign countries. The team has also earned national recognition as they played several seasons in the Portuguese third tier. It is also responsible for the formation of some notable players including, Emanuel Banda, who currently plays in Belgium in the first tier and has won the U-20 Cup of African Nations while playing for the Esmoriz side.

External links
Official website

Football clubs in Portugal
Association football clubs established in 1932
1932 establishments in Portugal